New Southgate Cemetery is a 22-hectare cemetery in Brunswick Park in the London Borough of Barnet. It was established by the Colney Hatch Company in the 1850s and became the Great Northern London Cemetery, with a railway service running from near Kings Cross station to a dedicated station at the cemetery, similar to the service of the London Necropolis Company to Brookwood Cemetery in Surrey.

The railway service to Great Northern London Cemetery soon closed, but the cemetery has remained open.

Great Northern Cemetery
After the closure of burial grounds in central London in the 1850s, there was a movement to establish new cemeteries further from the centre of the city. The Cemeteries Clauses Act 1847 allowed for the creation of commercial cemeteries, expanded upon by the Burial Act 1852.

The Colney Hatch Company acquired land for a cemetery near Colney Hatch (now known as New Southgate; the name was later changed to avoid association with the nearby Colney Hatch Lunatic Asylum). Originally intended to cover 200 acres, the cemetery eventually reached covered 150 acres.

The Great Northern London Cemetery Company was formed as a joint venture between the Great Northern Railway Company and the Colney Hatch Company under an 1855 local Act of Parliament. with a view to providing cheap and convenient burial services to the residents of central London.

A similar service was established in 1854 by the London Necropolis Company, running from London Necropolis railway station near Waterloo station to Brookwood Cemetery near Woking, Surrey, but the  journey took around 45 minutes compared to 15 minutes between Kings Cross and Colney Hatch.

The Great Northern London Cemetery Company aimed at the lower end of the market, charging 6 shillings to carry a coffin, and plus a return fare of 1s 6d for each mourner, plus another fee for burial, starting at 10s or 11s. The fees for burial at Brookwood Cemetery started at over £1.

A siding was built next to the main line north of King's Cross station with a separate station building (Great Northern Cemetery Station) off Maiden Lane (now York Way). The station included a wedge-shaped spire, and gothic arches, built above a retaining wall beside the railway line in a cutting below.  It included a morgue – intended to avoid the unhygienic storage of cadavers at the deceased's family home – and facilities for mourners, with a lift to carry coffins down to the tracks.

Rail services began in about 1861 and ran twice a week to Southgate & Colney Hatch (now New Southgate) station; north of the station, a single railway track ran to a terminus to the west of East Barnet Lane (later renamed Brunswick Park Road), beside the cemetery, where there were waiting rooms and chapels.

Rail services ceased at some point after 1873, and the station with its chapel were demolished after 1912. A Standard Telephones and Cables factory was built on the former location of the station in 1922; the site now forms part of North London Business Park.

New Southgate Cemetery
Although the rail service ceased, the cemetery remained open for burials. It was later renamed New Southgate Cemetery.

Later burials include the cemetery's architect and superintendent Alexander Spurr (died 1873) and Ross McWhirter (1925–1975). 

Perhaps the most famous person buried at the cemetery is Shoghi Effendi (1897–1957), the Guardian of the Baháʼí Faith, died on a visit to London in 1957 and, in accordance with the faith, was buried near the place of his death at New Southgate Cemetery. 

Dorothy Lawrence (1896–1964), a woman who surreptitiously served as a male soldier on the Western Front in World War I and was institutionalised at the Colney Hatch Lunatic Asylum where she died in 1964, was buried in a pauper's grave in the cemetery, where the site of her plot is no longer clear.

Other interments include statesman Richard Bethell (1800–1873),  physician Alfred Baring Garrod (1819–1907),  songwriter Fred W. Leigh (1871–1924) and criminal Tony Lambrianou (1942–2004).

The cemetery was acquired by New Southgate Cemetery and Crematorium Company in 1993. It now includes sections for Roman Catholic, Greek Orthodox, and Caribbean burials. Parts of the land that once formed part of the cemetery grounds are now a modern housing estate.

Since the 1950s, New Southgate cemetery has become the burial place for the North London Greek Cypriot community. The Greek Orthodox area was developed in 1998 and named after the Reverend Kyriacou Petrou, a local priest, who is also buried in this section.

The cemetery is a Site of Borough Importance for Nature Conservation, Grade II. The Pymmes Brook Trail runs along the eastern boundary.

In the latter year a crematorium was also opened here.

War graves
The cemetery contains war graves of 109 Commonwealth service personnel, two Belgian soldiers, and 51 German prisoners who were buried from the Alexandra Palace Internment Camp in World War I, besides 86 Commonwealth service war graves from World War II. A Cross of Sacrifice stands in front of the cemetery chapel. Those Commonwealth service personnel whose graves could not be marked by headstones are listed on a Screen Wall memorial for those of World War I and a Kerb Wall memorial for those of World War II. The monument to the German internees is a grade II listed structure.

See also
 Nature reserves in Barnet

References

Further reading
 
 Francis, Doris. (2005) The Secret Cemetery. Berg.

External links

 Kings Cross Cemetery Station, R.G. Lucas, The Railway Magazine October 1954
 New Southgate Cemetery and Crematorium, London Parks and Gardens Trust
 Death in the Household, Cassell's household guide, p. 314
 

 
Nature reserves in the London Borough of Barnet
Cemeteries in London
Parks and open spaces in the London Borough of Barnet
Disused railway stations in the London Borough of Barnet
Religion in the London Borough of Barnet